Tekle (Ge'ez, Tigrinya, Amharic: ተክለ meaning plant) may refer to the following people:
Given name
Princess Tekle of Georgia (1776–1846), Georgian princess 
Tekle Giyorgis (disambiguation), several people
Tekle Hailemikael, Ethiopian cyclist 
Tekle Hawaryat (1900–1969), Ethiopian politician 
Tekle Hawariat Tekle Mariyam (1884–1977), Ethiopian politician 
Tekle Haymanot (disambiguation), several people
Tekle Kidane (born 1939), Ethiopian football player 
Tekle Kiflay, Eritrean general

Surname
Afewerk Tekle (1932–2012), Ethiopian painter
Tesfalem Tekle (born 1993), Eritrean footballer

See also
Təklə (disambiguation)
Takla (disambiguation)